John Brinckerhoff Jackson may refer to:

 J. B. Jackson (1909–1996), artist
 John B. Jackson (1862–1920), diplomat